The 62nd Infantry Division (62-ya Pekhotnaya Diviziya) was an infantry formation of the Russian Imperial Army.

Organization
1st Brigade
245th Infantry Regiment
246th Infantry Regiment
2nd Brigade
247th Infantry Regiment
248th Infantry Regiment

Commanders
1914-1915: Alexander Iosafovich Ievreinov

References

Infantry divisions of the Russian Empire